It's Only Love is a compilation album by Simply Red. It was released in 2000 on East West Records. It peaked at #27 in the United Kingdom and #35 in Germany. The album is a compilation album primarily featuring the band's love ballads.

Track listing
 "If You Don't Know Me by Now"
 "Holding Back the Years"
 "Say You Love Me"
 "The Air That I Breathe"
 "It's Only Love" 
 "You've Got It"
 "Ev'ry Time We Say Goodbye"
 "For Your Babies"
 "Lady Godiva's Room"
 "Your Eyes (Mousse T Acoustic)"
 "Thank You"
 "Remembering the First Time"
 "Angel"
 "Night Nurse"
 "Never Never Love"
 "More"
 "Mellow My Mind"
 "Stars"
 "Ain't That a Lot of Love"

Charts

Weekly charts

Year-end charts

Certifications

References

External links
Simply Red official website album page
MP3.com album main page

2000 compilation albums
Simply Red albums
East West Records compilation albums